The Antrim County Board of the Gaelic Athletic Association or Antrim GAA is one of the 32 county boards of the GAA in Ireland, and is responsible for Gaelic games in County Antrim, Northern Ireland. The county board is also responsible for the Antrim county teams.

The county hurling team contested All-Ireland Senior Hurling Championship (SHC) finals on two occasions: 1943 and 1989. The county football team contested All-Ireland Senior Football Championship (SFC) finals on two occasions: 1911 and 1912.

As of 2009, there were 108 clubs affiliated to Antrim GAA — the third highest, alongside Limerick.

Hurling

Clubs

Clubs contest the Antrim Senior Hurling Championship.

Antrim's first All-Star, Ciaran Barr, helped Belfast club Rossa to reach the 1989 club hurling final and put in a great show against Buffer's Alley. Dunloy were back in the All-Ireland club final in 1995, when they lost in a replay, 1996 and 2003 when they were heavily beaten.

All-Ireland Senior Club Hurling Championships: 2
1983, 2012 (Loughgiel Shamrocks)
All-Ireland Junior Club Hurling Championships: 
2014 Kickhams Creggan
All-Ireland Intermediate Club Hurling Championships:
2015 O Donovan Rossa Belfast

County team

Antrim is the only Ulster county to appear in an All-Ireland Senior Hurling Championship (SHC) final, the first of which was in 1943 losing to Cork and the second was in 1989 losing to Tipperary. In 1943 Antrim defeated both Galway (by 7-0 to 6-2) and Kilkenny (by 3-3 to 1-6) in the old Corrigan Park, but disappointed in the All-Ireland against Cork. Two years previously, Antrim had been graded Junior a year before, and had been beaten by Down in the Ulster final. It was only competing in the Senior Championship because the Junior grade was abolished. Antrim hurlers featured strongly in Ulster Railway cup final appearances in 1945, 1993 and 1995. In hurling, the progression that began with Loughgiel's success at club hurling level in 1983 (with players like 15-stone goalkeeper Niall Patterson) culminated in an All-Ireland final appearance in 1989.

Football

Clubs

Clubs contest the Antrim Senior Football Championship.

All-Ireland Senior Club Football Championship
2010 (Naomh Gall, Beal Feirste)

County team

The county team was the first in the province of Ulster to appear in an All-Ireland final, in 1911 and repeated the feat again in 1912, losing on both occasions.

The county team has won the Ulster Senior Football Championship on ten occasions: 1900, 1901, 1908, 1909, 1910, 1911, 1912, 1913, 1946 and 1951.

A drawn Ulster SFC semi-final with Derry in 2000 was one of the highlights of Antrim's football at inter-county level, alongside winning the 2008 Tommy Murphy Cup, beating Wicklow in the final and gaining revenge for losing the 2007 final to the same opponents. Antrim reached the 2009 Ulster SFC final, the first Antrim team to do so for 31 years. The team lost  to the 2008 All-Ireland SFC winner Tyrone.

Camogie

Antrim have won the All-Ireland Senior Camogie Championship six times and been runners-up ten times. 
Camogie arrived in 1908 with the foundation of Banba club, but the movement joined by clubs such as Crowley's, Mitchel's and Ardoyne was short-lived. A 1927 revival was more successful and in 1934 there were three adult leagues in Belfast, southwest and north Antrim.

Antrim's successes include a three-in-a-row in 1945-7, with the benefit of a dispute that removed their main rivals Dublin and the arrival of a Dublin coach, Charlie MacMahon, and the fact four of their semi-finals and two of the finals were played at Corrigan Park and Antrim was described as the "home of camogie." Players from the Belfast league clubs such as Deirdre, St Malachy's and St Theresa’s and Glens villages such as Dunloy and Loughgiel Shamrocks to win all but a handful of the Ulster camogie championships played. They defeated Dublin in a 1956 semi-final that prevented Dublin winning 19 All-Ireland titles in a row. O'Donovan Rossa won the All-Ireland senior club championship in 2008. Antrim are the 2010 All-Ireland junior champions.

Notable players include team of the century member Mairéad McAtamney, player of the year winners Sue Cashman and Maeve Gilroy, All Star award winner Jane Adams and Gradam Tailte winner Josephine McClements, and All-Ireland final stars Marjorie Griffin, Marian and Theresa Kearns. Marie O'Gorman. Celia Quinn and Madge Rainey. 
Rosina MacManus, Nancy Murray and Lily Spence served as presidents of the Camogie Association.

Under Camogie's National Development Plan 2010-2015, "Our Game, Our Passion", five new camogie clubs were to be established in the county by 2015.

Antrim have the following achievements in camogie.

All-Ireland Senior Camogie Championships: 6
(click on year for team line-outs) 1945, 1946, 1947, 1956, 1967, 1979
All-Ireland Intermediate Camogie Championship: 3
2001
2003
2021
All-Ireland Junior Camogie Championships: 2
1997, 2010

Ladies' football
Antrim compete in the All-Ireland Junior Ladies' Football Championship.

Antrim have the following achievements in ladies' football.

All-Ireland Junior Ladies' Football Championships: 2
2009, 2012

References

External links
 Official Antrim GAA site
 Antrim on Hoganstand.com
 National and provincial titles won by Antrim teams
 Club championship winners

 
Gaelic games governing bodies in Northern Ireland
Gaelic games governing bodies in Ulster
Sport in County Antrim